Letchworth High School encompasses grades 9–12 in Gainesville, New York.

Letchworth library 
The mission of the Letchworth Central Middle and High School Library Media Program is to "ensure that students and staff are effective and discriminating life-long users of information." Effective use of information requires access to information in traditional, up-to-date, and future methods of technologies.  It is essential that the school library media program be integrated into the existing curriculum of every classroom, since "no one part of the system can achieve satisfactory results without the cooperation of other parts of the whole."

Teachers 
The Student-Teacher Ratio is 12.
Average years teaching is 13, Average years teaching in district is 11, First-year teachers 3%.
24% of teachers have a bachelor's degree  and 76% have a master's degree with 1% having a doctorate degree.

Students 

Student Ethnicity for 2004-2005 was 99% White, non-Hispanic and 1% African American.

References

External links
 Letchworth High School - official site

Public high schools in New York (state)
Schools in Wyoming County, New York